Marion Junior-Senior High School is a public school located outside Marion, Michigan, in Osceola County.  It serves grades 7–12 in the Marion Public Schools.

Students who meet the prerequisites may attend classes at Mid-Michigan Community College in Harrison or Baker College in Cadillac for credit in place of usual high school courses. Students may also attend the Wexford-Missaukee Area Career Technical Center, administered by the Wexford-Missaukee Intermediate School District.

Marion Junior-Senior High School offers a variety of classes and activities such as wood-working, band, choir, robotics, eSports, and volunteering in the community with their MPACT, SLS (Students leading students) and National Honor Society teams.

Marion recognizes students for many outstanding achievements

Demographics
The demographic breakdown of the 261 students enrolled in 2018-19 was:
Male - 47.1%
Female - 52.9%
Native American - 0.4%
Black - 1.9%
Hispanic - 1.1%
White - 95.4%
Multiracial - 1.1%
In addition, 62.5% of students were eligible for free or reduced lunch.

Athletics
The Marion Eagles are members of the West Michigan D League.  The school colors are maroon and white. MHSAA sanctioned sports offered are:

Baseball (boys)
Basketball (boys and girls)
Competitive cheer (girls)
Cross country (boys and girls)
Football (8-player) (boys)
Soccer (girls)
Softball (girls)
Track and field (boys and girls)
Volleyball (girls)

References

External links

Public high schools in Michigan
Public middle schools in Michigan
Schools in Osceola County, Michigan